The 2019 South Point 400 was a Monster Energy NASCAR Cup Series race held on September 15, 2019 at Las Vegas Motor Speedway in Las Vegas. Contested over 267 laps on the  asphalt intermediate speedway, it was the 27th race of the 2019 Monster Energy NASCAR Cup Series season, first race of the Playoffs, and the first race of the Round of 16.

Report

Background

Las Vegas Motor Speedway, located in Clark County, Nevada outside the Las Vegas city limits and about 15 miles northeast of the Las Vegas Strip, is a  complex of multiple tracks for motorsports racing. The complex is owned by Speedway Motorsports, Inc., which is headquartered in Charlotte, North Carolina.

Entry list
 (i) denotes driver who are ineligible for series driver points.
 (R) denotes rookie driver.

Practice

First practice

Final practice

Qualifying

Qualifying results

Race

Stage results

Stage One
Laps: 80

Stage Two
Laps: 80

Final stage results

Stage Three
Laps: 107

Kyle Busch/Garrett Smithley incident 
Late in the race, Kyle Busch was battling for position with William Byron when #52 Honest Abe Roofing driver Garrett Smithley, who was laps down, couldn't move down to get out of the way of the lead lap cars. Kyle Busch also didn't have enough time to move down, and Busch would hit Smithley in the rear. Busch would have major front end damage, saying "think the nose is knocked in. Fucking destroyed". Busch would go on to finish 19th, and Smithley 35th, 12 laps down.

Busch was noticeably frustrated during post race interviews, saying:

On Monday, September 16, Smithley would defend his actions on Twitter, tweeting ¨Held my line... 2 cars got around.¨ Fans were split on the issue- some saying Smithley should have gotten out of the way, while others saying Busch should have moved his line earlier. On the same day, Smithley would post an announcement on Twitter, defending his racing career up to that point and saying that he wasn't mad at Busch. Busch would criticize the skill of lapped car drivers, saying “We’re at the top echelon of motorsports, and we’ve got guys who have never won Late Model races running on the racetrack. It’s pathetic. They don’t know where to go. What else do you do?¨ On September 20, Smithley would tweet ¨Even when I don’t do anything @KyleBusch blames me. Went outta my way to give him room tonight. Think he might have thought I was in a different car. 🤷🏼‍♂️¨. As of now, nothing more has been said, but the question of skill needed in NASCAR has remained, recently brought up by Quin Houff´s incident with Matt Dibenedetto at the 2020 O'Reilly Auto Parts 500.

Race statistics
 Lead changes: 24 among 14 different drivers
 Cautions/Laps: 4 for 22
 Red flags: 0
 Time of race: 2 hours, 48 minutes and 34 seconds
 Average speed:

Media

Television
NBC Sports called the race on the television side. Rick Allen, Jeff Burton, Steve Letarte and Dale Earnhardt Jr. had the call in the booth for the race. Dave Burns, Parker Kligerman, Marty Snider and Kelli Stavast reported from pit lane during the race.

Radio
PRN covered the radio call for the race which was also be simulcast on Sirius XM NASCAR Radio. Doug Rice and Mark Garrow called the race in the booth when the field raced through the tri-oval. Rob Albright called the race from a billboard in turn 2 when the field raced through turns 1 and 2 & Pat Patterson called the race from a billboard outside of turn 3 when the field raced through turns 3 and 4. Brad Gillie, Brett McMillan, Wendy Venturini, and Heather DeBeaux worked pit road for the radio side.

Standings after the race

Manufacturers' Championship standings

Note: Only the first 16 positions are included for the driver standings.

References

South Point 400
South Point 400
South Point 400
NASCAR races at Las Vegas Motor Speedway